Someone Else's Déjà Vu is the third studio full-length from Son, Ambulance. It's the first full release by the band since 2004's Key.

The album is divided into four parts: A View of Minstrel Town (tracks 1-3), About the Public Square (tracks 4-7), To A Deserted Town (tracks 9-11), and Farewell Pulse (the final two tracks). Track 8, "and" (a forty-two second noise track), is not included in the list (though one would assume it to finish About the Public Square).

This is the 120th release from Saddle Creek Records.

Track listing

Personnel
Musicians

Joe Knapp (as Joseph Knapp) – Snare, Whistle, Vocal Cuica, Classical Guitar, Electric Guitar, Vocals, Drum Kit, Analog Synth, Broom, Snare, Cymbal, Wood Block, Piano, Electric Bass, Glockenspiel, Acoustic Guitar, Tarpaulin, 12-String, Cabasa, Knee-Slaps, Mellotron, Hand Claps, Mouth Noises, Fake Strings, Rhodes
John Kotchian – Upright Bass
Jordan Elsberry – Rhodes, Hammond Organ, Piano
Jose Ortez – Drum Kit
Jesse McKelvey – Electric Bass
Daniel Knapp – Rhodes, Vocals, Piano
Craig Demayo – Cymbal
Jacob Thiele – Analog Synth
Jim Schroeder – Delay Guitar, Vocals, Guitar Layers
Jenna Morrison – Vocals
Derek Pressnall – Vocals
Teal Gardner – Vocals
Jeffrey Koster – Conga, Drum Kit, Vocals, Tambourine, Percussion
Ben Brodin – Vibraphone
Dereck Higgins – Electric Bass
James Cuato – Saxophones
Kianna Alarid – Background Vocals
Alex Aparo – Electric Bass
AJ Mogis – Background Vocals, Electric Bass, Electric Guitar
Stuart Shell – Oboe
Neely Jenkins – Vocals
Neal Knapp – Vocals
Jamie Pressnall – Stomps, taps

Production

AJ Mogis – Recording, Production, Mixing
Doug Van Sloun – Mastering
Joe Knapp – Production
Jeffrey Koster – Production
Son, Ambulance – Album Design
Teal Gardner – Collage and drawings
Zack Nipper – Layout

References

2008 albums
Son, Ambulance albums
Saddle Creek Records albums